Eric Dawson Duncan  (born 10 November 1987) is a Canadian politician who was elected to represent the riding of Stormont—Dundas—South Glengarry in the House of Commons of Canada in the 2019 Canadian federal election. He is a member of the Conservative Party of Canada. Prior to his election to Parliament, Duncan served as mayor of the township of North Dundas from 2010 to 2018. He is the first Conservative MP to be elected as openly gay.

During his term as mayor he came out as gay, and during the 2019 federal election campaign he defended party leader Andrew Scheer over his stance on same-sex marriage by arguing that he would not run as a Conservative if his sexual orientation was not welcomed in the Conservative Party. After the Conservatives increased their seat count but did not displace the governing Liberals as the largest party in the House, Duncan argued that the party should rethink its approach to LGBTQ issues in order to resonate with voters.

Electoral record

References

External links 
 

Living people
Conservative Party of Canada MPs
Members of the House of Commons of Canada from Ontario
Gay politicians
Canadian LGBT Members of Parliament
Mayors of places in Ontario
LGBT mayors of places in Canada
1987 births
People from the United Counties of Stormont, Dundas and Glengarry
LGBT conservatism
Canadian gay men
21st-century Canadian politicians
21st-century Canadian LGBT people